Rebecca Ann Felton (née Latimer; June 10, 1835 – January 24, 1930) was an American writer, lecturer, feminist, suffragist, reformer, slave owner, and politician who was the first woman to serve in the United States Senate, although she served for only one day.

Felton was the most prominent woman in Georgia in the Progressive Era, and was honored by appointment to the Senate. She was sworn in on November 21, 1922, and served just 24 hours. At 87 years, nine months, and 22 days old, she was the oldest freshman senator to enter the Senate. She was the only woman to have served as a senator from Georgia until the appointment of Kelly Loeffler in 2020, nearly a hundred years later.

Her husband William Harrell Felton was a member of the United States House of Representatives and Georgia House of Representatives and she ran his campaigns. She was a prominent society woman who advocated for prison reform, women's suffrage, and educational modernization. Numan Bartley wrote that by 1915 she "was championing a lengthy feminist program that ranged from prohibition to equal pay for equal work yet never accomplished any feat because she held her role because of her husband."

She was also a white supremacist and Congress's last former slave owner, and spoke vigorously in favor of lynching.

Early life 
Felton was born in Decatur, Georgia, on June 10, 1835. She was the daughter of Charles Latimer, a prosperous planter, merchant, and general store owner. Charles was a Maryland native who moved to DeKalb County in the 1820s, and his wife, Eleanor Swift Latimer, was from Morgan, Georgia. Felton was the oldest of four children; her sister, Mary Latimer, also became prominent in women's reforms in the early 20th century. When she was 15, her father sent her to live with close relatives in the town of Madison where she attended a private school within a local Presbyterian church.  She then went on to attend Madison Female College, from which she received a classical liberal arts education. She graduated at the top of her class at age 17 in 1852.

In October 1853, she married Dr. William Harrell Felton at her home and moved to live with him on his plantation just north of Cartersville, Georgia. She gave birth to five children, one daughter and four sons. Only one, Howard Erwin Felton, survived childhood. In the aftermath of the Civil War, their plantation was destroyed.  Because they were now unable to rely on slave labor as a means of producing income, Dr. Felton returned to farming as a way to earn income until there was enough money to open a school. Felton and her husband opened Felton Academy in Cartersville, where she and her husband both taught.

Women's suffrage 

By joining the Woman's Christian Temperance Union in 1886, Rebecca Latimer Felton was able to achieve stature as a speaker for equal rights for white women. Upon her entrance into the public realm independent of her husband's political career in the late 19th century, Felton attempted to employ middle-class men to help middle-class women achieve equal status in society. She believed that it was necessary for men to be held accountable, and during her 1887 address at the Women's Christian Temperance Union state convention, she argued that women were actively fulfilling their duties as wives and mothers, but men undervalued their importance. She argued that women should have more power inside of the home with more influence on the decision-making process, proper education should be provided for both wives and daughters, women should have economic independence through this education, training, and later employment and women should have more influence over the children. In 1898, Felton wrote "Textile Education for Georgia Girls" as an attempt to convince Georgia legislators that education for girls was necessary. In this article, she argued that it was a man's responsibility to take care of his wife and children. Therefore, it was his responsibility to ensure his daughter had equal rights and opportunities to his sons.

However, this strategy was not working and in 1900 Felton joined the women's suffrage movement. This move led her to work tirelessly for women's rights, including the right to vote, the progressive movement, free public education for women, and admittance into public universities. A prominent activist for women's suffrage in Georgia, Felton found many opponents in anti-suffragist Georgians such as Mildred Lewis Rutherford. During a 1915 debate with Rutherford and other anti-suffragists before the Georgia legislative committee, the chairman allowed each of the anti-suffragists to speak for 45 minutes but demanded Felton stop speaking after 30 minutes.  Felton ignored him and spoke for an extra 15 minutes, at one point making fun of Rutherford and implicitly accusing her of hypocrisy. However, the Georgia legislative committee did not pass the suffrage bill. Georgia was later the first state to reject the Nineteenth Amendment to the United States Constitution when it was proposed in 1919, and unlike most other states in the Union, Georgia did not allow women to vote in the 1920 presidential election. Women in Georgia were not given the right to vote until 1922.

Felton criticized what she saw as the hypocrisy of Southern men who boasted of superior Southern "chivalry" but opposed women's rights, and she expressed her dislike of the fact that Southern states resisted white women's suffrage longer than other regions of the US. She wrote, in 1915, that women were denied fair political participation

except in the States which have been franchised by the good sense and common honesty of the men of those States—after due consideration, and with the chivalric instinct that differentiates the coarse brutal male from the gentlemen of our nation.  Shall the men of the South be less generous, less chivalrous? They have given the Southern women more praise than the man of the West—but judged by their actions Southern men have been less sincere. Honeyed phrases are pleasant to listen to, but the sensible women of our country would prefer more substantial gifts. ...

Racial views
After she was married at age eighteen, Felton and her husband owned slaves before the Civil War, and she was the last member of Congress to have been a slave owner.

Felton was a white supremacist. She claimed, for instance, that the more money that Georgia spent on black people's education, the more crimes black people committed.  For the 1893 World's Columbian Exposition, she "proposed a southern exhibit 'illustrating the slave period,' with a cabin and 'real colored folks making mats, shuck collars, and baskets—a woman to spin and card cotton—and another to play banjo and show the actual life of [the] slave—not the Uncle Tom sort.'" She wanted to display "the ignorant contented darky—as distinguished from  Harriet Beecher Stowe's monstrosities."

Felton considered "young blacks" who sought equal treatment "half-civilized gorillas", and ascribed to them a "brutal lust" for white women. While seeking suffrage for women, she decried voting rights for black people, arguing that it led directly to the rape of white women.

Felton also advocated more lynchings of black men, saying that such was "elysian" compared to the rape of white women. On August 11, 1898, Felton gave a speech in Tybee Island, Georgia, to several hundred members of the Georgia State Agricultural Society. She urged an increase in lynchings in order to protect rural white women from being raped by black men.

Newspapers reprinted a transcript of Felton's speech to garner support for the Democratic Party. On August 18, 1898, Alex Manly's Daily Record printed a rebuttal editorial arguing that white rape of black women was much more frequent, and contact between white women and black men was often consensual. Manly's editorial was used as a pretext for the Wilmington Insurrection of November 1898.

Manly was interviewed by the Baltimore Sun three days after the massacre, and he stated that he only had wished to defend "defamed colored men" libeled by Felton. He said that his editorial had been distorted by white newspapers. Felton's response appeared in the November 16 issue of the Raleigh News and Observer: "When the negro Manly attributed the crime to intimacy between negro men and white women of the South the slanderer should be made to fear a lyncher's rope rather than occupy a place in New York newspapers."

In 1899, a massive crowd of white Georgians arrested, tortured, and lynched a black man, Sam Hose, who had been falsely accused of murdering a white man and  raping his victim's wife. Felton said that any "true-hearted husband or father" would have killed "the beast" and that Hose was due less sympathy than a rabid dog.

Day as a senator

Thomas W. Hardwick, the Governor of Georgia, was planning to run as a candidate in the next election to the US Senate, which was due in 1924. However, the current incumbent Senator Thomas E. Watson died unexpectedly on September 26, 1922. As Governor, Hardwick was entitled to appoint a replacement for Watson until a special election could be arranged. Hardwick sought an appointee who would not be a competitor in the coming election, and to ingratiate himself with the new women voters (who had been alienated by Hardwick's opposition to the 19th Amendment). On October 3, Hardwick therefore selected Felton to serve as senator, because she was a well-known and respected representative of the suffrage movement. Congress was not expected to reconvene until after the special election, which was scheduled for November 7, so it was considered unlikely that Felton would ever be sworn in. Walter F. George defeated Hardwick by 55% to 33% in the Democratic Party primary, and was elected unopposed in the special election. Rather than take his seat immediately when the Senate reconvened on November 21, George allowed Felton to be sworn in. This was due in part to persuasion by Felton and a supportive campaign launched by the white women of Georgia. George benefited from the gesture, by presenting himself as a friend of the suffrage movement. Felton thus became the first female senator, serving until George took office one day later.

Final years
Felton was interviewed on film in 1929, discussing her political accomplishments and her memories of witnessing part of the Trail of Tears around the year 1838. Felton continued to write and lecture until her final days, finishing her book, The Romantic Story of Georgia's Women, shortly before her death in Atlanta in 1930.  Her remains were interred in the Oak Hill Cemetery in Cartersville.

Notable writings 
"The Country Home" (1898–1920) – recurring article within the Atlanta Journal
My Memoirs of Georgia Politics (1911)
Country Life in Georgia in the Days of my Youth (1919)
The Romantic Story of Georgia's Women (1930)

See also
Women in the United States Senate

Notes

References

 Talmage, John E.  Rebecca Latimer Felton: Nine Stormy Decades (1960)
 Talmage, John E. "Felton, Rebecca Ann Latimer" in Edward T. James, ed., Notable American Women: A biographical dictionary (1971) 1:606-7

Works cited

External links

 
 
 Rebecca Latimer Felton (1835–1930)  New Georgia Encyclopedia.
 U.S. Senate. First woman senator appointed. Retrieved March 1, 2005.
 Uncorrected transcript of interview with Richard Baker, Senate Historian, on C-SPAN Q&A television program, June 12, 2005
 Photograph of Rebecca Latimer Felton in 1927 Vanishing Georgia Collection.
 
 Felton Home historical marker
 Rebecca Latimer Felton historical marker
Video interview with Rebecca Latimer Felton in 1929
Transcript of Rebecca Latimer Felton's First and Only Speech to the U.S. Senate

|-

1835 births
1930 deaths
20th-century American writers
20th-century American women writers
American feminists
American proslavery activists
American suffragists
American temperance activists
Burials in Georgia (U.S. state)
Democratic Party United States senators from Georgia (U.S. state)
Female United States senators
Georgia (U.S. state) Democrats
People from Decatur, Georgia
American slave owners
American white supremacists
Women in Georgia (U.S. state) politics
Writers from Georgia (U.S. state)
American women slave owners
United States senators who owned slaves
Wikipedia articles incorporating text from A Woman of the Century